The Shalimar–Udaipur City Weekly Express is an Superfast Express train belonging to North Western Railway zone that runs between  and  in India. It is currently being operated with 20971/20972 train numbers on a weekly basis.

Service

The 20972/Shalimar–Udaipur City Weekly Express has an average speed of 56 km/hr and covers 1873 km in 33h 15m. The 20971/Udaipur City–Shalimar Weekly Express has an average speed of 58 km/hr and covers 1873 km in 32h 30m.

Time Table 

From Udaipur City to Shalimar - 20971. The train starts from Udaipur City on every Saturday.

Note : Train reverses it's direction at Kota Junction.

From Shalimar to Udaipur City - 20972. The train starts from Shalimar on every Sunday.

Note : Train reverses it's direction at Kota Junction.

Coach composition

The train has standard LHB rakes with max speed of 130 kmph. The train consists of 21 coaches:

 2 AC II Tier
 6 AC III Tier
 7 Sleeper coaches
 4 General Unreserved
 1 Divyangjan Cum Guard Coach
 1 Generator Car

Traction

Both trains are hauled by a Santragachi Loco Shed/Tughlakabad Loco Shed based WAP-7 Locomotive.

Direction reversal

The train reverses its direction at Kota Junction

See also 

 Udaipur City railway station
 Shalimar railway station
 Ananya Express

References

Notes

External links 

 19659/Shalimar–Udaipur City Weekly Express India Rail Info
 19660/Udaipur City–Shalimar Weekly Express India Rail Info

Rail transport in Howrah
Transport in Udaipur
Rail transport in West Bengal
Rail transport in Jharkhand
Rail transport in Odisha
Rail transport in Chhattisgarh
Rail transport in Madhya Pradesh
Rail transport in Rajasthan
Express trains in India
Railway services introduced in 2012